"Purple Toupee" is a 1988 song by alternative rock duo They Might Be Giants from their second album, Lincoln. It was released as a promotional single in 1989. In 1994, a live performance of the song was recorded for the promotional live album, Live!! New York City 10/14/94, which was released by Elektra Records.

According to John Linnell, the song's disjointed lyrics recount a warped memory of the 1960s. The song comments on a contemporary "sixties revival", which Linnell perceived as a "one-dimensional caricature" of the decade. In a nod to this inauthenticity, the lyrics are intentionally misleading, and do not accurately represent the events that they reference. Two Prince songs—"Purple Rain" and "Raspberry Beret"—also served as sources of inspiration for "Purple Toupee".

Promotion 
Bar/None Records advertised "Purple Toupee" by pasting fake labels on 8-track tapes by other artists. The cartridges, disguised as a release from TMBG, were mailed to radio stations, in addition to CDs that actually contained the song.

The song had a music video directed by Helene Silverman, who had previously done graphic design work with the band. The video was filmed at Coney Island and features John Linnell and John Flansburgh playing accordion and guitar, respectively, at Astroland Park.

Terminated EP 
"Purple Toupee" was intended for release as an EP with three B-sides. It was listed as a release for 12" vinyl, CD, and cassette. The following tracks were presented on the band's B-side compilation, Miscellaneous T:
 "Hey, Mr. DJ, I Thought You Said We Had A Deal"
 "Lady Is a Tramp"
 "Birds Fly"

The songs were also included on a 2013 reissue of Lincoln in Australian markets by Breakaway Records.

Notes
"Lady Is a Tramp" is a cover of the Rogers & Hart song.

Reception 
In his review of Lincoln, Robert Christgau cited "Purple Toupee" as a potential highlight from the album's A-side, though not as strong as the lead single "Ana Ng". He describes the song as "antiboomer". The track was also designated as an Allmusic "pick". Writing for Allmusic, Stewart Mason lauds the song's "infectious tune" and adds that the chorus is "among the duo's most endearing and memorable". Like Christgau, Mason speculates that it carries a baby-boomer theme from the perspective of a confused child of the 1960s. In an Allmusic review of the full album, Stephen Thomas Erlewine also names "Purple Toupee" one of the album's strong "pop hooks".

Personnel 
They Might Be Giants
John Linnell - accordion 
John Flansburgh - guitar

Production
Bill Krauss – Producer
Al Houghton – Engineer

References

External links 
Purple Toupee EP on This Might Be A Wiki
"Purple Toupee" (song) on This Might Be A Wiki
 Issue of SPIN containing an advertisement for the aborted EP

1989 singles
They Might Be Giants songs
1988 songs
Restless Records singles
Songs written by John Linnell
Songs written by John Flansburgh